The Americas Zone was one of the three regional zones of the 1969 Davis Cup.

9 teams entered the Americas Zone: 3 teams competed in the North & Central America Zone, while 6 teams competed in the South America Zone. The winner of each sub-zone would play against each other to determine who moved to the Inter-Zonal Zone to compete against the winners of the Eastern Zone and Europe Zone.

Mexico defeated Australia in the North & Central America Zone final, and Brazil defeated Chile in the South America Zone final. In the Americas Inter-Zonal Final, Brazil defeated Mexico and progressed to the Inter-Zonal Zone.

North & Central America Zone

Draw

Semifinals

Caribbean/West Indies vs. Mexico

Final

Mexico vs. Australia

South America Zone

Draw

Quarterfinals

Venezuela vs. Colombia

Chile vs. Argentina

Semifinals

Colombia vs. Brazil

Chile vs. Ecuador

Final

Chile vs. Brazil

Americas Inter-Zonal Final

Brazil vs. Mexico

References

External links
Davis Cup official website

Davis Cup Americas Zone
America Zone
Davis Cup